{{DISPLAYTITLE:C24H48O2}}
The molecular formula C24H48O2 (molar mass: 368.63 g/mol) may refer to:

 Ethylhexyl palmitate, or octyl palmitate
 Lignoceric acid, or tetracosanoic acid

Molecular formulas